Isabella of France (c. 1295 – 1358), was the daughter of Philip IV of France and Joan I of Navarre, queen consort of Edward II of England and mother of Edward III of England.

Isabella of France (or Isabelle, etc.) may also refer to:
Saint Isabelle of France (1225–1270), daughter of Louis VIII of France and Blanche of Castile
Isabella of France, Queen of Navarre (1241–1271), daughter of Louis IX of France and Marguerite of Provence, married  Theobald II of Navarre
Isabella of France, Dauphine of Viennois (1312-1348), daughter of Philip V of France and Joan II of Burgundy, married 1. Guigues VIII de La Tour du Pin, Dauphin de Viennois 2. John III, Lord of Faucogney
Isabella of Valois (1313-1388), Duchess of Bourbon, daughter of Charles of Valois and Mahaut of Châtillon, wife of Peter I, Duke of Bourbon
Isabelle of Valois (1348-1372), Countess of Vertus, daughter of John II of France and Bonne of Bohemia, ancestress of kings Louis XII and Francis I of France
Isabella of Valois (1389–1409), daughter of Charles VI of France and Isabeau of Bavaria, queen consort of Richard II of England